"On Down the Line" is a song written by Kostas, and recorded by American country music artist Patty Loveless.  It was released in May 1990 as the first single and title track from her album On Down the Line.

Background

The song derived from a collection of compositions written by Kostas, who was the composer of "Timber, I'm Falling in Love" and many other songs that Loveless had recorded. When Tony Brown (Loveless' producer at the time) became aware of the song, he was extremely doubtful that it would fit Loveless’ repertoire, mainly because of questionable lyric content in the third verse. As a direct result, Kostas reconstructed the last verse to be appropriately suitable to Loveless.

The song charted for 20 weeks on the Billboard Hot Country Singles and Tracks chart, reaching No. 5 during the week of July 21, 1990.

Chart positions

Year-end charts

References

1990 singles
Patty Loveless songs
Songs written by Kostas (songwriter)
Song recordings produced by Tony Brown (record producer)
MCA Nashville Records singles
1990 songs